Vista Heights is a residential neighbourhood in the northeast quadrant of Calgary, Alberta. It is bounded to the south by the Trans-Canada Highway and to the west by Deerfoot Trail. To the north and east it borders the South Airways Industrial Area.

Vista Heights was established in 1962. It is represented in the Calgary City Council by the Ward 5 councillor.

Demographics

Residents in this community had a median household income of $51,370 in 2000, and there were 25.4% low income residents living in the neighbourhood. As of 2000, 18.6% of the residents were immigrants. Most buildings were single-family detached homes and row houses, and 47% of the housing was used for renting.

Education
The community is served by the Vista Heights Elementary public school.

See also
List of neighbourhoods in Calgary

References

External links
Crossroads Community Association
Alberta Toner Cartridge Recyclers

Neighbourhoods in Calgary